French Kiss is the solo debut by former Fleetwood Mac singer/guitarist Bob Welch. The songs, with the exception of "Sentimental Lady", were intended for a projected third album by Welch's previous band, Paris. However, the group fell apart in 1977 before recording could begin. So instead, Welch used these songs for his debut solo album.

For the most part, French Kiss presents a mix of hard rock guitar, disco-ish rhythms and sweeping strings. The big hits were "Ebony Eyes" (with backing vocals by Juice Newton), which peaked at number 14 in the US; and a revised version of "Sentimental Lady", a song that Welch had originally recorded with Fleetwood Mac in 1972 for the album Bare Trees, which peaked at number 8. "Hot Love, Cold World" also became a minor hit, which peaked at number 31.

The album itself peaked at number 12 in the US and later went platinum. It is Welch's best-selling album.

The album features guest appearances by former Fleetwood Mac bandmates Mick Fleetwood, Christine McVie and Welch's successor, Lindsey Buckingham.

Track listing
All songs written by Bob Welch, except where noted.

Personnel

Musicians
Bob Welch – vocals, guitar, bass guitar
Alvin Taylor – drums (except "Sentimental Lady")
Mick Fleetwood – drums on "Sentimental Lady"
Christine McVie – background vocals on "Sentimental Lady", "Easy To Fall" and "Lose Your Heart"
Lindsey Buckingham – guitar and background vocals on "Sentimental Lady"
Gene Page – string arrangements
Juice Newton – background vocals on "Ebony Eyes"

Technical
 John Carter – producer, all tracks except "Sentimental Lady" 
 Lindsey Buckingham, Christine McVie – producer, "Sentimental Lady" 
 Warren Dewy – engineer, all tracks except "Sentimental Lady" 
 Richard Dashut, Ken Caillat – engineers, "Sentimental Lady"
 Art Sims – design
 Daniel Catherine – photography
 Olivier Ferrand – photography

Charts

Certifications

References

1977 debut albums
Bob Welch (musician) albums
Albums arranged by Gene Page
Capitol Records albums
Albums recorded at Sunset Sound Recorders